The 1985 Amstel Gold Race was the 20th edition of the annual road bicycle race "Amstel Gold Race", held on Sunday April 27, 1985, in the Dutch province of Limburg. The race stretched 242 kilometres, with the start in Heerlen and the finish in Meerssen. There were a total of 146 competitors, and 25 cyclists finished the race.

Result

External links
Results

Amstel Gold Race
April 1982 sports events in Europe
1985 in road cycling
1985 in Dutch sport
1985 Super Prestige Pernod International